Phoebe is the most massive irregular satellite of Saturn with a mean diameter of . It was discovered by William Henry Pickering on March 18, 1899 from photographic plates that had been taken starting on 16 August 1898 at the Boyden Station of the Carmen Alto Observatory near Arequipa, Peru, by DeLisle Stewart. It was the first satellite to be discovered photographically.

Phoebe was the first target encountered upon the arrival of the Cassini spacecraft in the Saturn system in 2004, and is thus unusually well-studied for an irregular satellite of its size. Cassini'''s trajectory to Saturn and time of arrival were specifically chosen to permit this flyby. After the encounter and its insertion into orbit, Cassini did not go much beyond the orbit of Iapetus.

Phoebe is roughly spherical and has a differentiated interior. It was spherical and hot early in its history and was battered out of roundness by repeated impacts. It is believed to be a captured centaur that originated in the Kuiper belt. Phoebe is the second largest retrograde satellite in the Solar System after Triton.

History
Discovery
Phoebe was discovered by William Henry Pickering on 17 March 1899 from photographic plates that had been taken starting on 16 August 1898 at the Boyden Observatory near Arequipa, Peru, by DeLisle Stewart. It was the first satellite to be discovered photographically.

Naming
Phoebe was named after Phoebe, a Titaness in Greek mythology that was associated with the Moon. It is also designated Saturn IX in some scientific literature. The IAU nomenclature standards have stated that features on Phoebe are to be named after characters in the Greek myth of Jason and the Argonauts. In 2005, the IAU officially named 24 craters (Acastus, Admetus, Amphion, Butes, Calais, Canthus, Clytius, Erginus, Euphemus, Eurydamas, Eurytion, Eurytus, Hylas, Idmon, Iphitus, Jason, Mopsus, Nauplius, Oileus, Peleus, Phlias, Talaus, Telamon and Zetes).

Toby Owen of the University of Hawaii at Manoa, chairman of the International Astronomical Union Outer Solar System Task Group said:

Orbit

Phoebe's orbit is retrograde; that is, it orbits Saturn opposite to Saturn's rotation. For more than 100 years, Phoebe was Saturn's outermost known moon, until the discovery of several smaller moons in 2000. Phoebe is almost 4 times more distant from Saturn than its nearest major neighbor (Iapetus), and is substantially larger than any of the other moons orbiting planets at comparable distances.

All of Saturn's regular moons except Iapetus orbit very nearly in the plane of Saturn's equator. The outer irregular satellites follow moderately to highly eccentric orbits, and none are expected to rotate synchronously as all the inner moons of Saturn do (except for Hyperion). See Saturn's satellites' families.

Phoebe ring

The Phoebe ring is one of the rings of Saturn. This ring is tilted 27 degrees from Saturn's equatorial plane (and the other rings). It extends from at least 128 to 207 times the radius of Saturn; Phoebe orbits the planet at an average distance of 215 Saturn radii. The ring is about 40 times as thick as the diameter of the planet. Because the ring's particles are presumed to have originated from micrometeoroid impacts on Phoebe, they should share its retrograde orbit, which is opposite to the orbital motion of the next inner moon, Iapetus. Inwardly migrating ring material would thus strike Iapetus's leading hemisphere, contributing to its two-tone coloration. Although very large, the ring is virtually invisible—it was discovered using NASA's infrared Spitzer Space Telescope.

Material displaced from Phoebe's surface by microscopic meteor impacts may be responsible for the dark areas on the surface of Hyperion. Debris from the biggest impacts may be the origin of the other moons of Phoebe's group (the Norse group)—all of which are less than 10 km in diameter.

Physical characteristics

It is Saturn's ninth-largest moon, but it might be the eighth-most massive. Hyperion, another one of Saturn's moons, has a larger radius, but is less massive than Phoebe. Phoebe rotates every nine hours and 16 minutes, and completes a full orbit around Saturn in about 18 months. Its surface temperature is on average .

Most of Saturn's inner moons have very bright surfaces, but Phoebe's albedo is very low (0.06), as dark as lampblack. The Phoebean surface is heavily scarred, with craters up to 80 kilometres across, one of which has walls 16 kilometres high.

Phoebe's dark coloring initially led to scientists surmising that it was a captured asteroid, as it resembled the common class of dark carbonaceous asteroids. These are chemically very primitive and are thought to be composed of original solids that condensed out of the solar nebula with little modification since then.

In addition, quantities of carbon dioxide have been detected on the surface, a finding that has never been replicated for an asteroid. It is estimated that Phoebe is about 50% rock, as opposed to the 35% or so that typifies Saturn's inner moons. For these reasons, scientists are coming to think that Phoebe is in fact a captured centaur, one of a number of icy planetoids from the Kuiper belt that orbit the Sun between Jupiter and Neptune. Phoebe is the first such object to be imaged as anything other than a dot.

Despite its small size, Phoebe is thought to have been a spherical body early in its history, with a differentiated interior, before solidifying and being battered into its current, slightly non-equilibrium shape.

Named features
Apart from one regio named after Phoebe's daughter, Leto, all named features are craters named after characters from the Greek legend of Jason and the Argonauts.

Maps

Formation
Phoebe formed in the Kuiper belt within three million years after the origin of the Solar System. This was early enough that sufficient radioactive material was available to melt it into a sphere and stay warm enough to have liquid water for tens of millions of years.

Observation and exploration

Unlike Saturn's other moons, Phoebe was not favorably placed for the Voyager probes. Voyager 2 observed Phoebe for a few hours in September 1981. In the images, taken from a distance of 2.2 million kilometres at low phase angle, the size of Phoebe was approximately 11 pixels and showed bright spots on the otherwise dark surface.Cassini passed  from Phoebe on 11 June 2004, returning many high-resolution images, which revealed a scarred surface. Because Voyager 2 had not been able to produce any high quality images of Phoebe, obtaining them was a priority for the Cassini mission and its flight path was deliberately designed to take it close by; otherwise, Cassini would likely not have returned images much better than Voyager's. Because of Phoebe's short rotation period of approximately 9 hours, 17 minutes, Cassini'' was able to map virtually the entire surface of Phoebe. The close fly-by enabled the mass of Phoebe to be determined with an uncertainty of only 1 in 500.

See also

 Moons of Saturn

Notes

References

External links

 Phoebe Profile at NASA's Solar System Exploration site
 Cassini–Huygens Multimedia: Images: Moons: Small Moons
 Cassini Pass Reveals Moon Secrets, BBC News, June 14, 2004
 The Planetary Society: Phoebe
 Asaravala, A.; Saturn's Odd Moon Out, Wired, (May 4, 2005)
 NASA: Natural Satellite Physical Parameters
 Cassini images of Phoebe
 Images of Phoebe at JPL's Planetary Photojournal
 Movie of Phoebe's rotation from the National Oceanic and Atmospheric Administration
 Phoebe basemap (December 2005) from Cassini images
 Phoebe atlas (March 2006) from Cassini images
 Phoebe nomenclature from the USGS planetary nomenclature page
 Phoebe on T. Denk's Outer Saturnian moons websites

Norse group
Moons of Saturn
Irregular satellites
18990317
Former dwarf planets
Moons with a retrograde orbit